WLRR (100.7 FM) is a radio station broadcasting an adult standards/MOR format. Licensed to Milledgeville, Georgia, United States, the station is currently majority-owned by Craig Baker, through licensee Starstation Radio, LLC.

History
The station went on the air as WPWS on 1988-02-17.  on 1990-06-04, the station changed its call sign to the current WLRR.

References

External links

LRR